The 2016–17 UEFA Youth League Domestic Champions Path was played from 21 September to 30 November 2016. A total of 32 teams competed in the Domestic Champions Path to decide 8 of the 24 places in the knockout phase of the 2016–17 UEFA Youth League.

Times up to 29 October 2016 (first round) were CEST (UTC+2), thereafter (second round) times were CET (UTC+1).

Draw
The youth domestic champions of the top 32 associations according to their 2015 UEFA country coefficients entered the Domestic Champions Path. Associations without a youth domestic champion as well as domestic champions already included in the UEFA Champions League path were replaced by the next association in the UEFA ranking.

For the Domestic Champions Path, the 32 teams were drawn into two rounds of two-legged home-and-away ties. The draw was held on 30 August 2016, 13:45 CEST, at the UEFA headquarters in Nyon, Switzerland. There were no seedings, but the 32 teams were split into four groups defined by sporting and geographical criteria prior to the draw.
In the first round, teams in the same group were drawn against each other, with the order of legs decided by draw.
In the second round, the 16 winners of the first round were divided into two groups: Group A contained the winners from Groups 1 and 2, while Group B contained the winners from Groups 3 and 4. Teams in the same group were drawn against each other, with the order of legs decided by draw.

Format
In the Domestic Champions Path, each tie was played over two legs, with each team playing one leg at home. The team that scored more goals on aggregate over the two legs advanced to the next round. If the aggregate score was level, the away goals rule is applied, i.e., the team that scored more goals away from home over the two legs advances. If away goals were also equal, the match would be decided by a penalty shoot-out (no extra time is played).

The eight second round winners advanced to the play-offs, where they were joined by the eight group runners-up from the UEFA Champions League Path.

First round
The first legs were played on 21, 27, 28, 29 September and 5 October, and the second legs were played on 19 October 2016.

|}

Málaga won 8–2 on aggregate.

1–1 on aggregate. PAOK won on away goals.

Roma won 9–1 on aggregate.

Čukarički won 5–2 on aggregate.

Ajax won 7–0 on aggregate.

Cork City won 1–0 on aggregate.

Midtjylland won 3–1 on aggregate.

Rosenborg won 3–1 on aggregate.

Viitorul Constanța won 5–1 on aggregate.

Zürich won 9–0 on aggregate.

Red Bull Salzburg won 8–0 on aggregate.

Sparta Prague won 9–0 on aggregate.

Dynamo Moscow won 7–0 on aggregate.

Maccabi Haifa won 8–2 on aggregate.

Kairat won 8–1 on aggregate.

Altınordu won 6–1 on aggregate.

Second round
The first legs were played on 2, 9 and 16 November, and the second legs were played on 22, 23 and 30 November 2016.

|}

Notes

Ajax won 4–1 on aggregate.

Roma won 4–1 on aggregate.

Midtjylland won 4–2 on aggregate.

Rosenborg won 2–1 on aggregate.

Altınordu won 8–5 on aggregate.

Viitorul Constanța won 5–2 on aggregate.

1–1 on aggregate. Maccabi Haifa won on away goals.

Red Bull Salzburg won 9–1 on aggregate.

References

External links
2016–17 UEFA Youth League

2